Estée Cattoor (born 1 May 2004) is a Belgian footballer who plays as a forward for OH Leuven and the Belgium national team.

International career
Cattoor made her debut for the Belgium national team on 12 June 2021, coming on as a substitute for Lyndsey Van Belle against Luxembourg.

References

2004 births
Living people
Women's association football forwards
Belgian women's footballers
Belgium women's international footballers
Oud-Heverlee Leuven (women) players
Super League Vrouwenvoetbal players
Belgium women's youth international footballers